Jose Carlo Dela Cruz Gonzalez (born August 14, 1983) better known for his stage name Carlo Gonzales, is a Filipino actor who joined Survivor Philippines: Celebrity Doubles Showdown.

Filmography

Filmography

Television

References

External links
 

Living people
Filipino male child actors
Participants in Philippine reality television series
Survivor Philippines contestants
GMA Network personalities
People from Zamboanga City
Former members of Iglesia ni Cristo
Converts to Roman Catholicism from Unitarianism
Filipino Roman Catholics
1990 births